Gary the Rat is an American adult animated sitcom created by the Cullen Brothers for Spike TV (previously known as TNN) and animated by Spike Animation Studios. It was produced by Grammnet Productions and Cheyenne Enterprises and distributed by Viacom.

It began as web episodes in flash animation on the internet in 2000, created by the defunct eStudio (later re-structured studio BLITZ) for Mediatrip.com. It consisted of 13 short episodes programmed in Adobe Flash which also included a game to occupy the viewer while the episode loaded in the background.

The network TV series aired on Spike in 2003, lasting for one season.

Premise
Gary "The Rat" Andrews is a self-centered, misanthropic defense attorney who awakens one morning to find that he has somehow transformed into a giant bipedal rat. Gary struggles to deal with his transformation and hold on to his status as a high-paid, if mercenary, lawyer. Until Gary figures out why he's like this he has decided to try and function the best he can in a "human" world. Outraged at his new appearance, Truman, a tenant in Gary's expensive apartment building, has hired exterminator Johnny Bugz to get rid of Gary for good.

Grammer said of the character, "Gary the Rat has been compromising every scruple to the point that he compromises his humanity."

Voice actors
 Kelsey Grammer as Gary "The Rat" Andrews, a successful and ruthless lawyer at Harrison, Camille, Beckett and Weiss who has turned into a 6-foot rat. According to the episode This Is Not a Pipe, Gary likes opera.
 Billy Gardell as Jack Harrison, Gary's boss and named partner at Harrison, Camille, Beckett and Weiss.
 Betty White as Gary's Mother, unseen and only appears as a voice on the telephone.
 Robb Cullen as  Johnny Bugz, a pest exterminator with a particular dislike of rats and pet cat called Boots.
 Brooke Shields as Cassandra Harrison, Mr. Harrison's wife. She only appeared in the episode Future Ex-Wife.
 Camille Grammer as Betty, Mr. Harrison's Secretary
 Spencer Garrett as Truman Pinksdale, President of the Montana Resident's Committee.
 John Mahoney as Steele, resident at the Montana apartment building. 
 David Hyde Pierce as Addison, resident at the Montana apartment building.
 Rick Gomez as Bud, a cheese delivery boy who is not very bright and mistakes Gary for being a dog.
 Hynden Walch as Little Girl, witness in the Southern Tobacco Company case.
 Ted Danson as Terry McMillian, con artist and suck up, joins the firm as their newest mergers and acquisitions lawyer. 
 Mary Stuart Masterson as Caroline Swanson, Gary's ex-girlfriend and an opposing lawyer. 
 Wayne Knight as Gary's rival, J. P. Wordley.
 Joe Pantoliano as Anthony 'the Heel' Stilletto 
 John Corbett as Frank Spillogotoriettio, lawyer with Boywe, Cheatem and Howe. He only appeared in the episode This Is Not a Pipe.
 Michael Keaton as Jerry Andrews, Gary's cousin and con artist, wanted for forgery, polygamy and other offenses.
 Vance DeGeneres as Additional Voices
 Susan Savage as April 
  Jonathan David Cook
 Seymour Cassel 
  Marnie Alexenburg 	
 Robert Goulet as Himself
 Kristin Bauer van Straten
 Rob Paulsen as Police Officer
 Kevin Michael Richardson 		
 Michael Panes

Media

List of Web Episodes
Episodes were approximately 3 minutes long, programmed in Adobe Flash which also included a game to occupy the viewer while the episode loaded in the background.

List of Network Episodes
Each episode begins with Gary having a surrealistic nightmare in which he is killed. During each episode Gary receives telephone calls from his mother in which he heartlessly dismisses her.

Critical reception
Kevin McDonough of United Media gave the show a negative review, praising the voice actors but calling the show itself "virtually laugh-free." Phil Gallo of Daily Variety thought that the first episode was "too serious" and that Grammer's character was derivative of Frasier Crane. Giving it one star out of four, Dean Johnson of The Boston Herald criticized the first episode as unfunny, and questioned whether the show would fit Spike's demographic.

A more favorable review came from Rob Owen of the Pittsburgh Post-Gazette, who thought that Grammer was "well-cast" and that it was the "least crude" of the three cartoons airing on Spike at the time (Ren & Stimpy "Adult Party Cartoon" and Stripperella). Matthew Williams of Toon Zone gave a mixed review, saying that some elements of episodes were drawn out for too long, but that Grammer "saves the show from mediocrity" and that he considered some of the jokes funny.

References

Release

The complete series has not been released on DVD or Blu-ray. However, all episodes are available on iTunes and Amazon Prime Video.

External links

 
 Gary the Rat webisodes (Wayback Machine archive)

2003 American television series debuts
2003 American television series endings
2000s American adult animated television series
2000s American sitcoms
2000s American workplace comedy television series
American adult animated comedy television series
American animated sitcoms
American flash adult animated television series
English-language television shows
Spike (TV network) original programming
Television series created by the Cullen Brothers
Fictional lawyers
Animated television series about mice and rats
Television series about shapeshifting